Trenomyces is a genus of fungi in the family Laboulbeniaceae. The genus contain 11 species.

References

External links
Trenomyces at Index Fungorum

Laboulbeniomycetes